Harvey Richardson (April 5, 1885 – December 30, 1946) was a Canadian professional ice hockey player. He played with the Quebec Bulldogs of the National Hockey Association.

References

1885 births
1946 deaths
Canadian ice hockey centres
Ice hockey people from Nova Scotia
Quebec Bulldogs (NHA) players
Sportspeople from the Cape Breton Regional Municipality